Belington is a town in Barbour County, West Virginia, United States, situated along the Tygart Valley River. The population was 1,804 as of the 2020 census.

History
Belington was founded in 1766–70. Originally it was known as the Barker Settlement, after Elias Barker, who had settled there with his brother William Barker. About 1785, it was called Yeagers, taking its name from a settler, George Yeager, and his sons. In 1855, it took its current name, Belington, from John Bealin, who had opened up a store there, and who would later move to Kansas.

After the June 3, 1861 Battle of Philippi, site of the first land battle of the Civil War, the Confederate forces, having been routed by the Union Army in Philippi, retreated south.  The Confederates made camp near the Laurel Mountain Road, today, a winding single lane dirt road that crosses the mountain and connects Belington with Elkins.

In 1891, the West Virginia Central and Pittsburg Railway (later the Western Maryland Railway) was built into Belington. In 1894 the land on the east side of the river was incorporated as Belington, while the west side was incorporated as Alston in 1897. The two towns merged in 1906 to form the present Belington.

The Bernard E. Wilmoth House in Belington is a historic house listed on the National Register of Historic Places.

Geography
Belington is located at  (39.025706, -79.938166).

Demographics

2010 census
As of the census of 2010, there were 1,921 people, 776 households, and 548 families living in the town. The racial makeup of the town was 98.3% White, 0.3% African American, 0.1% Asian, 0.1% Pacific Islander, 0.5% from other races, and 0.8% from two or more races. Hispanic or Latino of any race were 1.0% of the population.

There were 776 households, of which 33.4% had children under the age of 18 living with them, 49.2% were married couples living together, 15.7% had a female householder with no husband present, 5.7% had a male householder with no wife present, and 29.4% were non-families. 23.6% of all households were made up of individuals, and 13.8% had someone living alone who was 65 years of age or older. The average household size was 2.48 and the average family size was 2.88.

The median age in the town was 40.9 years. 23.8% of residents were under the age of 18; 6.5% were between the ages of 18 and 24; 24.5% were from 25 to 44; 27% were from 45 to 64; and 18% were 65 years of age or older. The gender makeup of the town was 47.6% male and 52.4% female.

2000 census
As of the census of 2000, there were 1,788 people, 713 households, and 518 families living in the town. The population density was 870.2 inhabitants per square mile (336.8/km2). There were 790 housing units at an average density of 384.5 per square mile (148.8/km2). The racial makeup of the town was 98.66% White, 0.06% African American, 0.17% Native American, 0.06% Asian, 0.06% Pacific Islander, and 1.01% from two or more races. Hispanic or Latino of any race were 0.67% of the population.

There were 713 households, out of which 33.7% had children under the age of 18 living with them, 54.1% were married couples living together, 14.7% had a female householder with no husband present, and 27.3% were non-families. 23.8% of all households were made up of individuals, and 11.5% had someone living alone who was 65 years of age or older. The average household size was 2.51 and the average family size was 2.95.

In the town, the population was spread out, with 26.3% under the age of 18, 7.7% from 18 to 24, 26.2% from 25 to 44, 24.0% from 45 to 64, and 15.8% who were 65 years of age or older. The median age was 38 years. For every 100 females, there were 97.4 males. For every 100 females age 18 and over, there were 89.2 males.

The median income for a household in the town was $22,154, and the median income for a family was $28,500. Males had a median income of $25,809 versus $15,050 for females. The per capita income for the town was $12,905. About 18.3% of families and 20.9% of the population were below the poverty line, including 29.9% of those under age 18 and 7.7% of those age 65 or over.

Climate
The climate in this area has mild differences between highs and lows, and there is adequate rainfall year-round.  According to the Köppen Climate Classification system, Belington has a marine west coast climate, abbreviated "Cfb" on climate maps.

References

External links

Towns in Barbour County, West Virginia
Towns in West Virginia